Cloneblaugh is a townland in County Tyrone, Northern Ireland. It is situated in the historic barony of Clogher and the civil parish of Clogher and covers an area of 308 acres. 

The name derives from the Irish: Cluain Bláthach (Flowery lawn or meadow).

The population of the townland declined during the 19th century:

See also
List of townlands of County Tyrone

References

Townlands of County Tyrone
Barony of Clogher